Music Connection is a United States-based monthly music-trade magazine, which began publication in 1977. It caters to career-minded musicians, songwriters, recording artists and assorted music-industry support personnel. The magazine began by focusing on the Southern California music scene, but now has a national focus and national distribution. The publication and its website offer inside information about the music business, including specialized directories of contact information about professionals and Free Classifieds for musicians. Music Connection also publishes reviews of unsigned and independent live performers and recording artists. A number of acclaimed artists achieved their first music-magazine-cover status from Music Connection. Those artists and groups include Guns N' Roses, Madonna, Jane's Addiction, Alanis Morissette, White Stripes and Adele.

Beginnings

Music Connection magazine was founded in 1977 in Los Angeles, Ca. by J. Michael Dolan, an unsigned singer-songwriter who worked as a background engineer/projectionist at various film and TV studios. Looking for songwriting gigs but finding no useful resource to help him, Dolan came up with the idea of a weekly music publication, with articles and reviews rivalling Cashbox and Billboard, and free classifieds patterned after the Recycler. After quickly realizing that his idea had a real chance of success he invited long-time pal Eric Bettelli to join the company as its first VP of Advertising. Eventually the publication became a “must read” for industry executives, and a trusted advocate for musicians and songwriters, who promptly dubbed it “the musician’s bible.” Shortly thereafter, Michael got the idea for Songwriter Connection magazine, which became part of the MC family of invaluable products and services. In 2010, after celebrating 33 years as CEO, Michael sold his shares of Music Connection Inc. to his longtime friend and partner, Eric Bettelli (who is now the sole Publisher, with Senior Editor Mark Nardone promoted to Associate Publisher/Senior Editor).

Online
Music Connection has maintained an online presence since 1997. The digital edition has an archive that currently dates back to January 2008. The company launched the AMP Network, in 2007.

Annual Top Artist lists
At the end of each year, Music Connection magazine publishes a Hot 100 Live Unsigned Artists and Bands list of live performers, as well as a Top 25 New Music Critiques list of unsigned recording artists. Artists who've appeared on the Hot 100 list include: 2003 Hot 100 Holy Ghost, 2003 and 2004 Hot 100 Sara Bareilles and 2008 Hot 100 Steel Panther.

National Directories
In the course of each year, Music Connection publishes a series of annually updated directories containing music industry contact information. The directories focus on the following areas: Music Attorneys, Record Label A&R Reps, Music Schools, Vocal Coaches, Mastering Studios, Film/TV Music Supervisors, Music Publishers, Producers and Engineers, Managers, Booking Agents, Guitar/Bass Instructors, Recording Studios, Indie Record Labels, Marketers/Promoters, Publicists, Rehearsal Studios, Gear Rental/Cartage/Tech Services, Duplicators/Replicators, Merchandise/Swag Manufacturers.

References

External links
 
Eric Bettelli Interview NAMM Oral History Library (2017)

1977 establishments in California
Monthly magazines published in the United States
Music magazines published in the United States
Magazines established in 1977
Magazines published in California